Jones Road Historic District is a national historic district located at East Hampton, New York in Suffolk County, New York. The district includes 19 contributing buildings; 10 principal buildings and nine outbuildings.  It is a rural enclave of residences built between about 1750 and 1921.

It was added to the National Register of Historic Places in 1988.

References

External links
Jones Road Historic District map (Living Places.com)

Historic districts on the National Register of Historic Places in New York (state)
Historic districts in Suffolk County, New York
National Register of Historic Places in Suffolk County, New York